Meitei input methods are the methods that allow users of computers (desktops, laptops and keyboards) to input texts in the Meitei script (Manipuri script), systematically for Meitei language (officially known as Manipuri language).

Unicode 

The Unicode charts of Meetei Mayek script are found in the following PDFs:
 https://unicode.org/charts/PDF/UABC0.pdf
 https://unicode.org/charts/PDF/UAAE0.pdf

The total number of characters in the Meitei Mayek script are:

 56 standard characters
 23 extension characters
 56 standard characters:
 27 mapi characters
 8 lonsum characters
 8 cheinap characters
 3 khudam characters
 10 cheising characters (10 digits)

Gboard 

The Meitei Mayek Gboard has most of the Unicode characters for the script but it still has some issues. Standard and historical characters are mixed up.

Apple iOS 13 

The Apple iOS 13 keyboard system supports the Manipuri language in both Meetei Mayek (Meetei script) as well as Bengali script. Apple users can go to Settings> General>Keyboards>Keyboards> and then tap on Add New Keyboard.

Google Translate 

Google Translate supports the phonetic keyboard to type the characters of the Meitei script.

Linux 

The Linux software system can render the Meitei Mayek keyboard. To install it, the font file (EPAOMAYEK.ttf) should be copied to fonts:/// in the File Manager of the user.

Macintosh operating systems 

Mac OS can render the Meitei Mayek keyboard, in various forms. 
It can be installed under Mac OS X as follows : font file (EPAOMAYEK.ttf) >> /Library/Fonts (for all users),
or >> /Users/Your_username/Library/Fonts (for your personal use only).
If the Font Book is present in the user's OS, then: double-click on a font file >> a preview pops with an "Install font" button.
It can also be installed under Mac OS 9 or less as follows: the fonts suitcases should be dragged into the System folder and should be added to the Fonts folder

Microsoft SwiftKey keyboard 

In the year 2015, the Microsoft SwiftKey keyboard supported Meitei (Manipuri), during its addition of 9 new Indian languages to the software system.

Windows 

The Manipuri Keyboard or Meitei Mayek Keyboard on the Windows was developed by Nongthonbam Tonthoi. Its version is 1.6.0. It can be installed on the Windows by using Android App Players like BlueStacks, Nox, KOPlayer, etc.

It can be installed under the Windows Vista as follows :
Select the font file (EPAOMAYEK.ttf) >> Right-click >> Install. 
It can also be installed under any version of Windows as follows :
Place the font file (EPAOMAYEK.ttf) into the Fonts folder, usually C:\Windows\Fonts or C:\WINNT\Fonts
(or by the Start Menu >> Control Panel >> Appearance and Themes >> Fonts).

See also 
 Meetei Mayek (Unicode block)
 Meetei Mayek Extensions (Unicode block)
 Wikipedia:Meitei script display help
 List of Meitei-language newspapers
 Meitei inscriptions

References

External links 

 
 
 
 
 
 

Meitei language
Meitei script
Keyboard layouts
Input methods
Indic computing